Robin Knoche (born 22 May 1992) is a German professional footballer who plays as a centre back for Bundesliga club Union Berlin. Knoche represented Germany youth teams from 2012 to 2015.

Club career

Wolfsburg 
Knoche is a product of VfL Wolfsburg's youth academy, first entering the club at the age of thirteen. Knoche made his senior first team debut in 2011 and was part of the squad that won the 2015 DFB-Pokal Final against Borussia Dortmund and the 2015 DFL-Supercup against Bayern Munich.

During the final relegation game of the 2018 Bundesliga season against Holstein Kiel on 21 May, Knoche scored a late header in the 75th minute off of a corner kick to secure Wolfsburg's hopes of staying in the Bundesliga. Midway through the following season, in a 3–0 win over Mainz, Knoche scored Wolfsburg's 1100th goal in the Bundesliga.

Union Berlin 
On 4 August 2020, Knoche signed for Union Berlin after his Wolfsburg contract expired at the end of the season.

Career statistics

Honours

Club
 VfL Wolfsburg
 DFB-Pokal: 2014–15
 DFL-Supercup: 2015

References

External links
 

1992 births
Living people
Sportspeople from Braunschweig
German footballers
Association football defenders
Bundesliga players
VfL Wolfsburg II players
VfL Wolfsburg players
1. FC Union Berlin players
Germany youth international footballers
Germany under-21 international footballers
Footballers from Lower Saxony